This article serves as a list of the political parties in Spain.

Spain has a multi-party system at both the national and regional level. Nationally, there are five dominant parties: United We Can (Podemos–IU), the Spanish Socialist Workers' Party (PSOE), Citizens - Party of the Citizenry (Cs), the People's Party (PP) and Vox (VOX).

At first a two-party system dominated by the PSOE and the PP, the current makeup makes it difficult for any formation or coalition to achieve an electoral majority in the bicameral Cortes Generales (consisting of both the national Congress of Deputies and regional representation in the Senate). Regional parties can be strong in autonomous communities, like Catalonia and the Basque Country, and are often essential for national government coalitions.

National political formations of Spain
Spanish Socialist Workers' Party (Partido Socialista Obrero Español, PSOE) — mainstream centre-left social democratic party linked to General Union of Workers (Unión General de Trabajadores, UGT) trade union. Along with its Catalan instance, the Socialists' Party of Catalonia (Partit dels Socialistes de Catalunya, PSC), it currently conforms the largest group in Congress. The party has governed from 1982 to 1996, from 2004 to 2011 and since 2018.
People's Party (Partido Popular, PP) — mainstream centre-right party, that is conservative, Catholic and economically liberal and which conforms the second-largest group in Congress and leads the parliamentary opposition. It has established alliances with regional right-of-centre parties such as Asturias Forum (Foro Asturias) and Navarrese People's Union (Unión del Pueblo Navarro, UPN). The People's Party originates from the People's Alliance (Alianza Popular, AP) refoundation in 1989. The party has governed from 1996 to 2004 and from 2011 to 2018.
Vox — a right-wing to far-right party that split from the People's Party in 2014 whose main ideologies are social and national conservatism, economic liberalism and centralism (i.e. strong opposition to Spain's peripheral nationalisms). Vox opposes LGBT movements in Spain while endorsing anti-LGBT rhetoric abroad, rejects european federalism and defends narrowing the naturalisation of immigrant individuals of maghrebi origin. It has allied to other right-wing to far-right political parties from Latin America, Italian Brothers of Italy and Hungarian Fidesz.
United We Can (Unidas Podemos, UP, formerly known as Unidos Podemos) — an anti-austerity left-wing electoral alliance led by the leftist 2014-founded party We Can (Podemos). The alliance is also formed by the United Left (Izquierda Unida, IU), which is associated with Workers' Commissions (Comisiones Obreras, CCOO) trade union, as well as by the green-left Green Alliance (Alianza Verde, AV) and other left-wing parties. This political space is branded differently in Galicia and in Catalonia. United We Can forms a coalition government with PSOE since 2020 and is related and overlapping, but not equivalent, to the 2022-founded left-wing electoral platform Unite (Sumar), led by the PCE-affiliated Minister of Labour Yolanda Díaz. 
Citizens (Ciudadanos, Cs) — a centre-right liberal and Spanish nationalist party. It supports a high degree of political decentralization, but it rejects autonomous communities' right to self-determination. In 2019, its popular support sharply declined. The party has established electoral alliances with the People's Party in Navarre and in the Basque Country. 
More Country (Más País, MP) — a progressive green party originated around the Madrid-based More Madrid (Más Madrid, MM) party in 2019. More Madrid itself originates from Madrid Now (Ahora Madrid) a local We Can-related alliance. The party has an electoral alliance with the ecologist Greens Equo (Verdes Equo, Q) party and the left-wing valencianist Commitement (Compromís) coalition. More Country and Greens Equo have also joined United We Can member parties in Andalusia.

Political parties with parliamentary representation

Represented in the Congress of Deputies

Represented in regional parliaments

Political parties without representation 
 Animalist Party with the Environment (Partido Animalista Con el Medio Ambiente, PACMA) (2003–present) — a centre-left party focused on the fight for animal rights, the environment and social justice. The party seeks to ban all sorts of bullfighting events.
 Falange Española de las JONS (FE-JONS) (1976–present) 
 Libertarian Party (Partido Libertario, P-LIB) (2009–present)
 Escaños en Blanco [es] (2010–present)
 National Alliance (Alianza Nacional) (2006–present) 
 For a Fairer World (Por un Mundo Más Justo, PM+J) (2004–present) 
 Zero Cuts (2014–present) 
 Green group (1994–present) 
 Humanist Party (Partido Humanista, PH) (1984–present)
 Carlist Party (Partido Carlista) (1970–present) 
 Comunión Tradicionalista Carlista [es] (1986–present)
 Pirate Party (Partido Pirata) (2006–present)
 Internet Party (Partido de Internet) (2009–present) 
 Authentic Phalanx (Falange Auténtica) (2002–present)
 Confederation of the Greens (Confederación de los Verdes) (1984–present)
 Anticapitalists (Anticapitalistas) (1995–present) 
 Land Party (Partido da Terra) (2011–present)
 Overwhelmed and Annoyed Citizens
 Citizens for Blank Votes
 Cannabis Party
 Party of the Democratic Karma
 Alianza para el Desarrollo y la Naturaleza
 Iniciativa Socialista de Izquierdas
 Los Parados
 Los Verdes Ecopacifistas 
 Nueva Izquierda Verde
 Nuevo Partido por la Democracia

 Partido Familia y Vida (PFyV)
 Actúa (2017–present) 
 Partido de los Autónomos Jubilados y Viudas
 Republican Alternative (2013–present) 
 Partido Ibérico 
 Partido Mutuo Apoyo Romántico
 Solidaridad y Autogestión Internacionalista (SAIn) 
 Foro Centro y Democracia (CYD) 
 Muerte al Sistema (+MAS+)
 SOMOS España
 Volt Spain (2018–present)

Communist parties 
 Communist Unification of Spain (1973–present)
 Spanish Communist Workers' Party (PCOE) (1973–present)
 Communist Party of the Peoples of Spain (PCPE) (1984–present)
 Communist Party of Spain (Marxist-Leninist) (2006–present)
 Revolutionary Left (2017–present)
 Communist Party of the Workers of Spain (PCTE) (2019–present)
 Internationalist Socialist Workers' Party (POSI) (1980–present)
 Internationalist Struggle (LI) (1999–present)

Nationalist parties 
 National Democracy (1995–present)
 España 2000 (2002–present)
 Spanish Alternative (2003–present)
 Party for Freedom (2013–present)

Regionalist parties

Andalusia 
 Partido Regionalista por Andalucía Oriental (PRAO) [es]

Asturias 
 Partíu Asturianista  (1985–present)
 Andecha Astur (1990–present)
 Asturian Left (1992–present)
 Unidad Regionalista Asturiana
 Bloc for Asturias 
 Coalición Asturiana
 Unidá

Basque Country 
 Zutik 
 Zornotza Eginez (local)

Cantabria 
 Cantabrian Nationalist Council (1995–present)

Castile and León 
 Partido de El Bierzo (1979–present) 
 Partido Regionalista del País Leonés (1980–present)
 Unidad Regionalista de Castilla y León (1992–present)
 Izquierda Castellana (2002–present)
 Agrupación de Electores Independientes Zamoranos
 Partido de Castilla y León (PCAL) [es]

Catalonia 
 Estat Català (1922–present)
 Pirate Party of Catalonia (Pirata.cat)
 National Front of Catalonia (2013–present)

Extremadura 
 United Extremadura (1980–present)

Galicia 
 Galician People's Front (1986–present)

Madrid 
 The Greens of the Community of Madrid

Navarre 
 Batzarre (1987–present)

Defunct parties

Defunct major parties 
 People's Socialist Party (1968–1978)
 National Union (1979–1982)
 People's Alliance, refounded as People's Party (1976–1989)
 Liberal Party, absorbed into the People's Party (1976–1989)
 People's Democratic Party, absorbed into the People's Party (1982–1989)
 Union of the Democratic Centre (1977–1983), refounded as Democratic and Social Centre (1982–2006) (merged into PP)
 Euskadiko Ezkerra, absorbed into Socialist Party of the Basque Country (1977–1993)
 Majorca Socialist Party, absorbed into PSM–Nationalist Agreement
 Democratic Reformist Party (1983–1986) 
 Valencian Union (1982–2014) 
 Andalusian Party (1965–2015) 
 Herri Batasuna (1978–2001), refounded as Batasuna (2001–2013), the political branch of ETA, illegal 
 Euskal Herritarrok (1998–2003), banned 
 Communist Party of the Basque Homelands (2002–2008), outlawed
 Convergence and Union (1978–2015)
 Aralar (2000–2017)
 Nafarroa Bai (2004–2015)
 Amaiur (2011–2015)
 Platform for Catalonia (2002–2019) (merged into Vox)
 Union, Progress and Democracy (2007–2020), a progressive party which ideologically combined social liberalism with centralism from the radical centre of political spectrum. It strongly supported the unity of Spain, thereby being an enemy of Spain's peripheral nationalism.

Defunct minor parties 
 National Alliance July 18 (1977)
 Spanish Solidarity (1982–1984) 
 Republican Social Movement (1999–2018)
 Basque Nationalist Action (1930-2008), outlawed 
 Askatasuna (1998–2009), banned 
 Herritarren Zerrenda (2004), banned 
 Demokrazia Hiru Milioi (2009), outlawed 
 Partido Galeguista (1977–1984)
 Galician Coalition (1983–2012)
 Commoners' Land (1988–2009)
 Alianza por la Unidad Nacional (1995–2005) (Merged into National Alliance) 
 Spanish Democratic Party (1996–2008) 
 Nós–Unidade Popular (2001–2015) 
 Cantabrian Unity (2002–2011)
 Union of the Salamancan People (2002–2014)
 Another Democracy is Possible (2003–2006)
 National Front (2006–2011)
 Unión Centrista Liberal (1978–2014)

Historical parties

Reign of Isabella II 
Moderate Party (1834–1874)
Progressive Party (1834–1874)
Democratic Party (1849–1869)
Liberal Union (1858–1874)

Sexenio Democrático 
Moderate Party (1834–1874)
Progressive Party (1834–1874)
Democratic Party (1849–1869)
Liberal Union (1858–1874)
Traditionalist Communion (1869–1937)
Radical Democratic Party (1871–1880)
Federal Democratic Republican Party (1868–1912)
Constitutional Party (1872–1880)

Bourbon restoration 
Conservative Party (1876–1931)
Liberal Party (1880–1931) 
Traditionalist Communion (1869–1937)
Regionalist League of Catalonia (1901–1936)
Republican Nationalist Federal Union (1910–1917)
Republican–Socialist Conjunction (1909–1919)
Maurist Party (1913–1930)
Reformist Party (1912–1924)
Radical Republican Party (1908–1936)
Spanish Patriotic Union (1924–1930)

Second Spanish Republic 
National Front
Confederación Española de Derechas Autónomas (1933–1937)
Popular Action (1930–1933) 
Spanish Agrarian Party (1934–1936)
Spanish Nationalist Party (1930–1936)
Spanish Renovation (1933–1937) 
Traditionalist Communion (1869–1937)
Popular Front
Republican Left (1934–1959) 
Republican Union (1934–1958)
Syndicalist Party (1934–1976) 
Workers' Party of Marxist Unification (1935–1980)
Radical Republican Party (1908–1936)
Falange Española de las JONS (1934–1937) 
Falange Española (1933–1934)
Juntas de Ofensiva Nacional-Sindicalista (1931–1934)
Regionalist League of Catalonia (1901–1936) 
Radical Socialist Republican Party (1929–1934) 
Liberal Republican Right (1930–1936)
Republican Action (1925–1934)
Conservative Republican Party (1932–1936)
Party of the Democratic Centre (1936–1939)

Francoist Spain 
Falange Española Tradicionalista y de las Juntas de Ofensiva Nacional Sindicalista (1937–1977)
Falange Española de las JONS (1934–1937) 
Traditionalist Communion (1869–1937)

See also
 Politics of Spain
 List of political parties by country
 List of political parties in Catalonia
 List of political parties in Galicia 
 Liberalism and radicalism in Spain
 Republicanism in Spain 
 Anarchism in Spain 
 The far-right in Spain 
Federalism in Spain 
 Parties and factions in Isabelline Spain 
 List of registered political parties in Spain by geographic location

References

 
 
Political parties